Journey to the 5th Echelon is the second studio album by Odd Future sub-group The Jet Age of Tomorrow. It was released on December 31, 2010. It contains guest appearances from Hodgy, Mike G, Vince Staples, JQ, Kilo Kish, Om'Mas Keith, Casey Veggies, and Tyler, the Creator.

Release and promotion 
On February 4, 2011, a music video for "Wonderland" was posted on the official Odd Future YouTube channel.

Track listing 
 All credits adapted from Discogs.

Personnel 
 The Jet Age of Tomorrow - primary artist, executive producer, producer on tracks 1-10 and 12-19
 Hodgy - featured artist on track 5
 Mike G - featured artist on track 5
 Left Brain - co-producer on track 7
 Tyler Major - co-producer on track 8
 Vince Staples - featured artist on track 9
 JQ - featured artist on track 9
 Tyler, the Creator - producer on track 11,  featured artist on track 17
 Kilo Kish - featured artist on track 12
 Michael Uzowuru -  co-producer on track 12
 Om'Mas Keith - featured artist on track 13
 Casey Veggies - featured artist on track 17
 Kream Team - co-producer on track 18

References 

2010 albums
Albums produced by Left Brain
Albums produced by Tyler, the Creator
Concept albums
Albums produced by Michael Uzowuru